Events from the year 2023 in Romania.

Incumbents 

 President: Klaus Iohannis
 Prime Minister: Nicolae Ciucă
 Deputy Prime Ministers: Hunor Kelemen and Sorin Grindeanu
 President of the Chamber of Deputies: Marcel Ciolacu
 President of the Senate: Alina Gorghiu (acting/ad interim)
 President of the High Court of Cassation and Justice: Corina Corbu
 President of the Constitutional Court: 
 Ciucă Cabinet

Ongoing events 

 COVID-19 pandemic in Romania
 Moldovan–Romanian collaboration during the COVID-19 pandemic

Events

January 

 1 January:
 The minimum gross pay increases from 2,550 Romanian lei to 3,000 Romanian lei, while the minimum wage in construction is increased from 3,000 lei to 4,000 lei.
 The pension point becomes worth 1,785 Romanian lei.
 A law regarding tips and the taxation of tips enters force.
 2 January – Ioan Ovidiu Sabău becomes technical head of the FC Universitatea Cluj, replacing Eugen Neagoe.
 3 January – The bank accounts of Banca Românească customers become EximBank accounts, as part of an ongoing absorption process by the latter of the former.
 4 January:
 Car parts manufacturer Altur SA Slatina goes into insolvency.
 Romanian public carrier TAROM replaces CEO Mihăiță Ursu with its chief financial officer, Costin Iordache.
 5 January:
 The Romanian Olympic and Sports Committee announces Romania's team of 18 that is taking part at the 2023 European Youth Olympic Winter Festival.
 During a press conference, education minister Ligia Deca discourages pupils from skipping classes in the context of the flu season.
 SCM "U" Craiova defeats FC Argeș Pitești, score 68-62, during the 13th stage of the national men's basketball cup.
 The Ministry of Finance borrows, through two benchmark type loans, 3.347 million lei from banks.
 7 January:
 The terms of Daniel Grădinaru and Daniel Horodniceanu within the CSM start.
 Romanian deputy Viorel Focșa is excluded from the Alliance for the Union of Romanians, following a Facebook post where he was telling how he had beaten his wife. The party asks of him to resign from being a member of the Parliament of Romania.
 8 January:
 Romsilva is expecting a gross profit of 250 million lei throughout 2023, half of the one recorded throughout 2022.
 Bogdan Țîru signs with CFR Cluj to be transferred from Jagiellonia Bialystok.
 9 January:
 President Klaus Iohannis promulgates several laws, including one prolonging the mandates of four out of the seven members of the regelementation committee of the National Authority for Reglemantation in the Energy domain ( for a period of six months. The president of the National Authority for Reglementation in the Energy domain, Dumitru Chiriță, is among those people.
 A new season of Survivor România starts.
 CS Dinamo București inaugurates a swimming academy.
 10 January:
 The general assembly of the Romanian Association of Banks votes on the make-up of its board of directors, following the vacancy of one seat.
 CFR Cluj announces it has reached a deal with FC Ballkani on transferring Ermal Krasniqi from the latter to the former.
 At 16:00 EET, the first ruling coalition meeting of 2023 takes place.
 The Romanian translation of Prince Harry's Spare novel is published officially in Romania.
 The National Bank of Romania announces the raise of its monetary policy key interest rate from 6.75% to 7% per annum, effective on the 11th of January.
 President Klaus Iohannis promulgates a law meant to fund the construction of a Victims of Communism Museum in Washington, D.C., with 3 million United States dollars.
 Minister of Foreign Affairs Bogdan Aurescu receives the Brazilian ambassador to Romania, Maria Laura da Rocha, who nears the end of her term in Romania. He expressed his support for Brazil's president, Lula da Silva.
 Low cost carrier Wizz Air announces the closure of its hub in Bacău.
 President Klaus Iohannis promulgates a law declaring the day of the 11th of June "The Day of the Victory of the Revolution from 1848 and of Romanian Democracy".
 Andrew Tate and his brother, Tristan, appeal their sentence at the Bucharest Court of Appeal. The court found the claims of the appeal to be unfounded, which keeps the Tate brothers into custody.
 11 January:
 The monetary policy key interest rate of the National Bank of Romania is raised from 6.75% to 7% per annum.
 Babeş-Bolyai University claimed that the suspicions of plagiarism in the doctoral thesis of Interior Minister Lucian Bode “are confirmed in the vast majority” and requested the withdrawal of the book published on its basis. The position expressed by the university of Cluj, where Lucian Bode made a doctoral thesis in the field of energy security, comes after the ethics committee of the educational institution verified the minister’s work.
 11-15 January - The 2023 EduSport Trophy for figure skating is scheduled to be held in Otopeni.

Scheduled and expected events

January 
 12 January:
 Tudor Gheorghe's "Valsurile Mele" (My Waltzes) concert is scheduled to take place at Sala Palatului.
 The women's ACS Sepsi-SIC basketball team is scheduled to be facing Basket Namur Capitale at the FIBA EuroCup in Sfântu Gheorghe.
 The headquarters of the Romanian Cultural Institute is expected to host an art exposition named "Artiști români pe mapamond" (Romanian artists on the globe), until the 28th of February.
 15 January
 The National Museum of History of Romania is scheduled to show the public a trophy earned by poet Vasile Alecsandri in Montpellier in 1878.
 The  - Road of Gold season is scheduled to premiere on Antena 1.
 20 January
 Season 13 of Românii au talent is scheduled to premiere on Pro TV.
 21–22 January: 22nd stage of the 2022–2023 Liga I season.
 27 January – After being moved between courts, the first term of the Romanian Revolution case is scheduled to commence in the preliminary chamber of the Supreme Court.

February 

 6 February - A trial where Romanian politician Ludovic Orban accuses the Government of Romania of not willing to hold local elections in 50 localities lacking mayors is scheduled to start.
 10 February - The Romanian Tennis Federation is scheduled to vote its new president.
 11 February – Romania in the Eurovision Song Contest – Selecția Națională is scheduled to be broadcast live, featuring 12 finalists running for Romania's bid at the 2023 Eurovision Song Contest.
 14 February – 2023 Romania and Moldova high-altitude objects: The Romanian Air Force unsuccessfully attempts to intercept an unidentified flying object detected roughly 11,000 metres (6.8 mi) above Southeast Romania.

 17–19 February – Roughly 50 events are expected to kick in the scheduled year of cultural events as part of Timișoara's part in the round of 2023 European Capitals of Culture: Elefsina, Veszprém and Timișoara.
 22–26 February – The National Chemistry Olympiad is scheduled to take place.
 22 February – The High Court of Cassation and Justice is scheduled to debate an extraordinary appeal regarding the imprisonment of Cristian Popescu Piedone, in the Colectiv nightclub fire case.

March 

 1–4 March – André Rieu and the Johann Strauss Orchestra are expected to hold four concerts on the BTarena in Cluj-Napoca.
 2 March – The appeal on the honours inheritance from the historic FC Steaua dispute between CSA Steaua București and FCSB is scheduled to take place at the High Court of Cassation and Justice.
 3–5 March – The first edition of the Masiff Festival is scheduled to take place in Poiana Brașov.

April 

 10–14 April – The National Biology Olympiad and the National Mathematics Olympiad are expected to take place.

May 

 4-16 May - The 2023 edition of the Grand Chess Tour is scheduled to be hosted in Bucharest.

July 

 5–9 July – The National Astronomy and Astrophysics Olympiad is expected to take place.
 24–28 July – The National Olympiad of Sciences for Juniors is expected to take place.

November 

 30 November – The RetuRO system, aimed at rewarding Romanians financially for recycling PET, glass or metal bottles and containers is expected to become operational.

Date unknown 
 A political congress of the Force of the Right will be taking place in March or April, according to its president, Ludovic Orban.

Deaths 

 2 January – Dumitru Radu Popescu, 87, novelist, poet and dramatist.
 3 January – Mitică Popescu, 86, film, radio, theater, television and voice actor.
 12 January – Aurel Mitran, 68, rock band manager (Holograf).
 17 January – Teodor Corban, 65, actor (12:08 East of Bucharest, 4 Months, 3 Weeks and 2 Days, Tales from the Golden Age).

See also 

 2023 in Romanian kickboxing
 2023 in the European Union
 2023 in Europe
 Romania in the Eurovision Song Contest 2023

References